Events from the year 1804 in Scotland.

Incumbents

Law officers 
 Lord Advocate – Charles Hope; then Sir James Montgomery, Bt
 Solicitor General for Scotland – Robert Blair

Judiciary 
 Lord President of the Court of Session – Lord Succoth
 Lord Justice General – The Duke of Montrose
 Lord Justice Clerk – Lord Eskgrove, then Lord Granton

Events 
 January –  founders on patrol off Scotland, apparently striking the Inchcape rock, with the loss of all 491 on board.
 5 April – High Possil meteorite, the first recorded meteorite to fall in Scotland in modern times, falls at Possil.
 19 August – St Peter's Church, Aberdeen, is dedicated as the city's first purpose-built post-Reformation Roman Catholic church.
 14 September – lighthouse on Inchkeith, designed by Thomas Smith and Robert Stevenson, is first illuminated.
 The Glasgow Herald is first published under this title.
 Galashiels Baptist Church is established as an independent Baptist congregation.

Births 
 7 January – George Deas, judge (died 1887)
 13 January – John Pringle Nichol, scientist (died 1859)
 1 March – John Henderson, ecclesiastical architect (died 1862)
 20 June – John Forrest, military doctor (died 1865 in England)
 15 July – Jane Stirling, pianist, student of Chopin (died 1859)
 18 September – John Steell, sculptor (died 1891)
 3 November – Charles Baillie, Lord Jerviswoode, judge (died 1879)
 Robert Davidson, inventor (died 1894)
 Alexander McKay, heavyweight bare-knuckle boxer (died of injury sustained in fight 1830 in England)
 James Mackay, politician in New Zealand (died 1875 in New Zealand)
 George Thompson, shipowner and politician (died 1895)

Deaths 
 11 January – James Tytler, editor of Encyclopædia Britannica (born 1745; died in the United States)
 26 July – Sir James Cockburn, 8th Baronet, politician (born c.1729)
 4 August – Adam Duncan, 1st Viscount Duncan, admiral (born 1731; died just south of the border en route to Edinburgh)
 23 October – David Rae, Lord Eskgrove, judge (born 1724)

The arts
 John Galt's poem The Battle of Largs is published anonymously, the author's first published work.
 David Wilkie paints Pitlessie Fair and William Chalmers-Bethune, his wife Isabella Morison and their Daughter Isabella.

See also 
 1804 in the United Kingdom

References 

 
Scotland
Years of the 19th century in Scotland
1800s in Scotland